Gilman Township is a township in Osceola County, Iowa, USA.
The city of Ashton is located in Gilman Township.

History
Gilman Township was founded in 1884.

References

Townships in Osceola County, Iowa
Townships in Iowa
Populated places established in 1884
1884 establishments in Iowa